Denmark competed at the 2016 Summer Olympics in Rio de Janeiro, Brazil, from 5 to 21 August 2016. Danish athletes have appeared in every edition of the Summer Olympic Games throughout the modern era, except for the sparsely attended 1904 Summer Olympics in St. Louis. The Danish team consisted of 120 athletes, 79 men and 41 women, across sixteen sports.

Denmark returned home from Rio de Janeiro with 15 medals (2 golds, 6 silver, and 7 bronze), marking the country's most successful outcome in Summer Olympic history since 1948. Three of these medals were awarded to the Danish squad in cycling, two in badminton, rowing, sailing, and swimming, and one each in sprint kayaking, track and field, and Greco-Roman wrestling. These Games also witnessed a historic moment for the male Danes in collective sports, as they overcame the two-time defending French champions 28–26 to win their first ever gold medal in the men's handball tournament.

Among the nation's medalists were badminton tandem Kamilla Rytter Juhl and Christinna Pedersen in the women's doubles, rower Morten Jørgensen, who completed a full set of medals at his third Games with a silver in the men's lightweight fours, hurdler Sara Slott Petersen, who made history by becoming the first Danish woman to ascend the podium in any track event, and Greco-Roman wrestler and three-time Olympian Mark Madsen, who brought home the country's first ever medal in his signature sport after more than eight decades.

Two Danish athletes collected more than a single medal at these Games, including track cyclist Lasse Norman Hansen, who won a bronze each in both men's team pursuit and omnium, and swimmer Pernille Blume, who outlasted the favorites in the women's 50 m freestyle to hand her country's first Olympic swimming title since 1948. Additionally, Blume helped the Danish foursome of backstroker Mie Nielsen, breaststroker and world-record holder Rikke Møller Pedersen, and butterfly sprinter and four-time Olympian Jeanette Ottesen beat the European record for the bronze medal in the women's medley relay final.

Medalists

The following Danish athletes won medals at the Games. In the by discipline sections below, medalists' names are bolded.

|  style="text-align:left; width:78%; vertical-align:top;"|

|  style="text-align:left; width:22%; vertical-align:top;"|

Competitors
The National Olympic Committee and Sports Confederation of Denmark fielded a roster of 120 athletes, 79 men and 41 women, to compete across sixteen different sports at these Games; it was the nation's largest delegation sent to the Olympics since 1972, beating the record of 119 athletes who attended the Atlanta Games two decades earlier. Denmark qualified teams in men's handball and in men's football for the first time in 24 years.

Swimming accounted for the largest number of athletes on the Danish squad by an individual-based sport, with 15 entries. There was only a single competitor each in table tennis, tennis, triathlon, and Greco-Roman wrestling.

Fourteen of the nation's Olympic medalists from London 2012 returned, with rowing tandem Rasmus Quist Hansen and Mads Rasmussen (men's lightweight double sculls), as well as track cyclist Lasse Norman Hansen (men's omnium), looking to defend their respective titles in Rio de Janeiro. Rifle prone marksman and 2000 silver medalist Torben Grimmel headed the full roster of experienced Danish athletes by competing at his fifth consecutive Games. Joining Hansen and Rasmussen as four-time Olympians were butterfly and freestyle swimmer Jeanette Ottesen, Finn sailor and 2012 silver medalist Jonas Høgh Christensen, and rower and 2012 fourth-place finalist Juliane Elander Rasmussen in the women's lightweight double sculls.

Other notable athletes on the Danish roster featured badminton player and 2014 world bronze medalist Viktor Axelsen in the men's singles, sprint kayaker and 2008 silver medalist Rene Holten Poulsen, breaststroke swimmer and current world record holder Rikke Møller Pedersen, long-distance freestyle swimmer and 2008 bronze medalist Lotte Friis, and Greco-Roman wrestler and mixed martial arts fighter Mark Madsen. Former top-ranked tennis player Caroline Wozniacki was selected by the committee to carry the Danish flag at the opening ceremony, the first by a female since 1988 and third overall in Summer Olympic history.

| width=78% align=left valign=top |
The following is the list of number of competitors participating in the Games. Note that reserves in fencing, field hockey, football, and handball are not counted as athletes:

Athletics

Danish athletes have so far achieved qualifying standards in the following athletics events (up to a maximum of 3 athletes in each event): London 2012 Olympians Andreas Bube and Sara Slott Petersen, along with 2010 Youth Olympic hurdler Stina Troest, were among the first batch of Danish track and field athletes being named to the Olympic roster on 17 May 2016, and were joined by three marathon runners (one man and two women) three days later.

Track & road events
Men

Women

Badminton

Denmark has qualified a total of eight badminton players for the following events into the Olympic tournament based on the BWF World Rankings as of 5 May 2016: two entries in the men's singles, one in the women's singles, and a pair each in the men's, women's, and mixed doubles.

Men

Women

Mixed

Canoeing

Sprint
Danish canoeists have qualified one boat in each of the following events through the 2015 ICF Canoe Sprint World Championships.

Qualification Legend: FA = Qualify to final (medal); FB = Qualify to final B (non-medal)

Cycling

Road
Danish riders qualified for a maximum of three quota places in the men's Olympic road race by virtue of their top 15 final national ranking in the 2015 UCI Europe Tour. The road cycling team, led by two-time Olympian Jakob Fuglsang, was named to the Olympic roster on 23 June 2016.

Track
Following the completion of the 2016 UCI Track Cycling World Championships, Danish riders have accumulated spots in the men's team pursuit, as well as both the men's and women's omnium. The track cycling squad, highlighted by reigning Olympic champion Lasse Norman Hansen in the men's omnium, was named on 18 June 2016.

Pursuit

Qualification Legend: FA=Final (medal); FB=Bronze medal game; SF=Semifinals

Omnium

Mountain biking
Danish mountain bikers qualified for one men's and one women's quota place each into the Olympic cross-country race, as a result of the nation's eighteenth-place finish for men and eleventh for women, respectively, in the UCI Olympic Ranking List of 25 May 2016. The mountain biking squad was named to the Olympic roster on 9 June 2016.

BMX
Danish riders qualified for one men's and one women's quota place in BMX at the Olympics, as a result of the nation's top three placement for men, not yet qualified, at the 2016 UCI BMX World Championships, and top three for women in the UCI BMX Individual Ranking List of 31 May 2016. BMX riders Niklas Laustsen and European Games champion Simone Christensen were named to the Olympic roster on 13 June 2016.

Equestrian

Denmark has fielded a composite squad of four riders into the Olympic team eventing by virtue of the following results in the individual FEI Olympic rankings: top two finishes from North Western Europe, and two top six finishes from the combined overall FEI Olympic rankings.

Dressage
Long list for the dressage team was published on 30 April. Final team was named on 17 July, after several observation events which included FEI Nations Cup competitions in Odense and Aachen as well as the Danish Dressage Championships in Broholm.

Football

Summary

Men's tournament

Denmark's men's football team qualified for the Olympics by reaching the semifinals at the 2015 UEFA European Under-21 Championship in the Czech Republic.

Team roster

Group play

Quarterfinal

Golf

Denmark has entered four golfers (two per gender) into the Olympic tournament. Søren Kjeldsen (world no. 50), Thorbjørn Olesen (world no. 64), Nicole Broch Larsen (world no. 88), and Nanna Koerstz Madsen (world no. 109) qualified directly among the top 60 eligible players for their respective individual events based on the IGF World Rankings as of 11 July 2016.

Handball

Summary

Men's tournament

Denmark's men's handball team qualified for the Olympics by virtue of a top two finish at the third meet of the Olympic Qualification Tournament in Herning. On 16 July, the team of 14 players and a reserve was nominated by the Danish Handball Federation, for official selection by the NOC.

Team roster

Group play

Quarterfinal

Semifinal

Gold medal match

Rowing

Denmark has qualified four boats for each of the following rowing classes into the Olympic regatta. Three rowing crews had confirmed Olympic places for their boats each in the men's lightweight four, women's pair, and women's lightweight double sculls at the 2015 FISA World Championships in Lac d'Aiguebelette, France, while the rowers competing in both the women's single and double sculls were added to the Danish roster with their top four finish at the 2016 European & Final Qualification Regatta in Lucerne, Switzerland.

Team Denmark announced the first batch of rowers (men's lightweight four, women's pair, and women's lightweight double sculls) on 12 May 2016. Meanwhile, the remaining crews that earned Olympic spots through the European & Qualification regatta were named to the Danish roster on 14 June 2016. Among the rowers qualifying for the Games were reigning Olympic champions Rasmus Quist Hansen and Mads Rasmussen (men's lightweight double sculls), and London 2012 bronze medalist Fie Udby Erichsen (women's single sculls).

Men

Women

Qualification Legend: FA=Final A (medal); FB=Final B (non-medal); FC=Final C (non-medal); FD=Final D (non-medal); FE=Final E (non-medal); FF=Final F (non-medal); SA/B=Semifinals A/B; SC/D=Semifinals C/D; SE/F=Semifinals E/F; QF=Quarterfinals; R=Repechage

Sailing

Danish sailors have qualified one boat in each of the following classes through the 2014 ISAF Sailing World Championships, the individual fleet Worlds, and European qualifying regattas. Team Denmark will determine the official list of sailors with the highest overall series score having accumulated in three selection trial meets of each fleet.

On 4 March 2016, four sailors had been selected to the Danish Olympic team for Rio: skiff duo Jena Mai Hansen and Katja Salskov-Iversen (49erFX), and multihull tandem Anette Viborg Andreasen and 2012 Olympian Allan Nørregaard (Nacra 17). Single-handed sailors Michael Hansen (Laser) and 2012 Finn silver medalist Jonas Høgh Christensen had claimed their Olympic spots at the Princess Sofia Trophy Regatta, while the remaining crews rounded out the selection at the ISAF World Cup meet in Hyeres, France.

Men

Women

Mixed

M = Medal race; EL = Eliminated – did not advance into the medal race

Shooting

Danish shooters have achieved quota places for the following events by virtue of their best finishes at the 2014 and 2015 ISSF World Championships, the 2015 ISSF World Cup series, and European Championships or Games, as long as they obtained a minimum qualifying score (MQS) by 31 March 2016.

On 5 November 2015, Team Denmark had officially announced the shooting squad for the Games.

Qualification Legend: Q = Qualify for the next round; q = Qualify for the bronze medal (shotgun)

Swimming

Danish swimmers have so far achieved qualifying standards in the following events (up to a maximum of 2 swimmers in each event at the Olympic Qualifying Time (OQT), and potentially 1 at the Olympic Selection Time (OST)): To qualify for the individual events, swimmers must achieve times set by the Danish Swimming Federation and the Danish NOC at either the 2015 World Aquatics Championships, the 2016 Danish Open or the 2016 European Aquatics Championships.

On 4 November 2015, five swimmers had been officially chosen to be part of the Danish Olympic team for the Games, including current world-record holder Rikke Møller Pedersen in the breaststroke, and 2008 Olympic bronze medalist Lotte Friis in long-distance freestyle. Four more swimmers (Glæsner, Ipsen, Joensen, and Blume), along with the members of the men's 4 × 200 m freestyle relay team, were officially named to the Danish roster on 10 May 2016, extending the swimming team size to thirteen.

Men

Women

Table tennis

Denmark has entered one athlete into the table tennis competition at the Games. Jonathan Groth secured one of the remaining Olympic spots in the men's singles by winning the repechage group final at the European Qualification Tournament in Halmstad, Sweden.

Tennis

Denmark has entered one tennis player into the Olympic tournament. London 2012 Olympian Caroline Wozniacki (world no. 34) qualified directly for the women's singles as one of the top 56 eligible players in the WTA World Rankings as of 6 June 2016.

Triathlon

Denmark has entered one triathlete to compete at the Games. Andreas Schilling was ranked among the top 43 eligible triathletes in the men's event based on the ITU Olympic Qualification List as of 15 May 2016.

Wrestling

Denmark has qualified one wrestler for the men's Greco-Roman 75 kg into the Olympic competition, as a result of his top six finish at the 2015 World Championships.

Men's Greco-Roman

See also
Denmark at the 2016 Summer Paralympics

References

External links 

 DIF.dk – Rio 2016 Olympic Coverage  
 

Olympics
2016
Nations at the 2016 Summer Olympics